Fran Silvestre Arquitectos is a studio based in Valencia made up a multidisciplinary group of architects founded in 2005 by architect Fran Silvestre.

Career 

Fran Silvestre (born 5 July 1976) is a Spanish architect. After having graduated in Architecture with honors at the Escuela Técnica Superior de Arquitectura de Valencia in 2001, he specialized in urban planning at the Technische Universiteit Eindhoven a year later, obtaining the highest grade as well. During his stay in The Netherlands, he collaborated in the architecture office MVRDV. Then, he won a scholarship to work at the studio of the Pritzker Prize architect from Portugal, Alvaro Siza, which is located in Oporto, and have ever since undertaken projects in cooperation with him. He is also dedicated to teach as professor at the Universidad Politecnica de Valencia since 2006, and the Universidad Europea since 2009. In 2016 he obtained his Doctor degree, with a distinction cum laude, at the Polytechnical University of Valencia, before a tribunal presided by Carlos Ferrater, professor and head of Department at the Polytechnical University of Catalonia.

Influenced by the above-mentioned architect, Alvaro Siza, or the sculptor Andreu Alfaro, among others, the studio realizes series of projects that take into account factors such as, modulation, serialization or light. Thus, giving rise to buildings of high purity, using constant innovative materials and technologies. Since its foundation, it has focused on the development and implementation of small-scale projects, for instance, The Atrium House (2009) or the House at the mountainside of a Castle (2010). It also carries out multidisciplinary work while designing objects like the Alis chair, collaborating with other studios such as Alfaro Hofmann, which is dedicated to interior design.

Jointly with the Universidad Politécnica de Valencia and the Technological Institute of Energy (ITE), located in Valencia, it has recently developed the Eólica Wind Tower. It is conceived as a vertical element, able to supply power to itself, without having to use other external sources. The power system is composed of series of turbines and current inverters connected to the grid.

As a result of these and many other works, he has received international awards such as the MHK Award (Berlin) in 2009, the Nagrade Hise Award in 2011, the Red Dot Design Award in 2013, and the first prize in the Spanish Biennial of Architecture and Urbanism Award in 2016. He has also participated in international congresses, such as the Cityliv, which took place in Maastricht in 2013, or the International Congress of Architecture of Panamá in 2014.

The firm's projects have been published in international magazines of architecture and design such as, Architectural Record, Pencil, GG, GA Houses, On-Site, or AV3, and exhibited in very important museums and galleries of art and design.

Notable projects 

 Atrium House (2009)
 House in olive grove (2009)
 House on the mountainside of a castle (2010)
 Eolica Tower (2011)
 House on the cliff (2012)
 Aluminium House (2013)
 Balint House (2014)
 House between the Pine Forest (2016)
 Headquarters of the new offices ARV (2016)
 Hofmann House (2017)
 Petra Stone Atelier (2017)
 House of Sand (2019)

Academic career 

He is professor of the Projects Department at the School of Architecture in the Polytechnical University of Valencia, where he was Deputy Director until 2011, and at the European University of Valencia, where he also runs a master's degree in architecture and design named MArch, in which collaborate architects such as Alvaro Siza, Eduardo Souto de Moura, Carlos Ferrater, Aires Mateus and Juan Domingo Santos. He currently holds the Victor L. Regnier Distinguished Visiting Professorship at Kansas State University, for which he will serve as visiting professor in the architecture department, teaching a 5th year architecture graduate studio. He has also participated as a visiting professor at:
 School of Architecture in Granada (2006)
 School of Architecture in Sevilla (2008)
 School of Architecture in La Coruña (2009)
 Centre for Architecture of New York (2012)
 College of Architecture + Design, University of Tennessee, Knoxville (2012)
 School of Architecture, Blacksburg (2012)
 School of Art in Almeria (2013)
 School of Art in Almeria (2016)
 School of Architecture and Design, Virginia Tech (2017)
 Kansas State University (2017)

Awards 

 Arquia Foundation, 2001
 Remodelling of the access crypt to Colonia Guell, Gaudí, 2002
 Mention COACV Award (2007, 2008, 2009)
 MHK Award (Berlin), 2009
 Selected for the exhibit “On Site: Architecture in Spain”, at the MoMA in New York, 2009
 Finalist in ArchDaily for Building of the year 2010
 Nagrade Hise Award, 2011
 Finalist in ArchDaily for Building of the year 2012
 Red Dot Design Award, 2013
 Award for Best Architecture Studio in Comunidad Valenciana, Tendencias, 2013
 Nominated for the ENOR Awards, 2014
 Selected for the Wan Awards, 2015
 Best Residential Architect BUILD Architecture Award, 2015
 Nominated for the German Design Award 2015
 XIII Spanish Biennial of Architecture and Urbanism Award, 2016

Exhibitions 

 2008 "New Architecture in Spain", MoMA, New York
 2012 "GA Gallery: Emerging Future", Tokyo
 2013 "GA Houses Project", Tokyo
 2013 Aimer, Aimer, Bâtir, Villa Noailles

References

Bibliography 
 Architectural Record April 2013 ISSN 0003-8598
 GA Document 121: International Emerging Future 2012 
 GA Houses 127  
 GA Houses 125 
 GA Houses 121

External links 
 

Architecture firms of Spain